Hunter is an unincorporated community in Belmont County, in the U.S. state of Ohio.

History
Hunter was laid out in 1849, and named for W. F. Hunter, an Ohio congressman. A post office called Hunter was established in 1850, and remained in operation until 1907.

References

Unincorporated communities in Belmont County, Ohio
1849 establishments in Ohio
Populated places established in 1849
Unincorporated communities in Ohio